Lončarjev Dol is a settlement in the hills east of Sevnica in east-central Slovenia. The area is part of the historical region of Styria. The entire Municipality of Sevnica is now included in the Lower Sava Statistical Region.

References

External links
Lončarjev Dol at Geopedia

Populated places in the Municipality of Sevnica